The Vuelta Femenina a Guatemala is an annual professional road bicycle race for women in Guatemala.

Winners

Classification jerseys
 – leader of the General classification
 – leader of the Mountains classification
 – leader of the Points classification
 – leader of the Guatemalan rider classification

References

Cycle races in Guatemala
Recurring sporting events established in 2007
Women's road bicycle races
Annual sporting events in Guatemala